Pech or Pesh is a Chibchan language spoken in Honduras. It was formerly known as Paya, and continues to be referred to in this manner by several sources, though there are negative connotations associated with this term. Alternatively, it has rarely also been referred to as Seco, Bayano, Taia, Towka, and Poyuai. According to Ethnologue there were a thousand speakers in 1993. It is spoken near the north-central coast of Honduras, in the Dulce Nombre de Culmí municipality of Olancho Department. 

Pech is thought to have South American origin, as it shares similar roots with the Kuna language of Panama.  Pech is the only remaining Chibchan language in Honduras and is currently classified as a severely endangered language.

Distribution
According to Dennis Holt (1999), Pech is spoken by perhaps around 600 people in Olancho Department and Colón Department of Honduras. Pech used to be spoken in the town of Dulce Nombre de Culmí in the Río Guampú watershed, but Pech speakers moved out of the town due to the influx of Ladino migrants. The three primary Pech settlements are as follows.

Vallecito, about 5 km northwest of Dulce Nombre de Culmí. It had 120 inhabitants in 1975.
Marañones, also known as Pueblo Nuevo Subirana or Kahã Wayka (New Town). This town is about 15 km north of Dulce Nombre de Culmí. It had 150 inhabitants in 1975.
El Carbón, originally known as Santa María del Carbón. It is located near the Quebrada Agua Amarilla in a higher mountain valley in the upper Río Seco watershed, and is about 35 km north of Culmí and about 30 km northeast of San Esteban. It had about 300 inhabitants in 1975.

Vallecito and Marañones are both located in the foothills of the Sierra de Agalta.

Other smaller Pech settlements which have at most several ethnic Pech families are scattered around northern Olancho Department, including the following (Holt 1999).

La Danta
Aguazarca
Aguaquire
Pisijiri
Jocomico

At the time of initial Spanish contact, Pech was most likely spoken from Trujillo in the west to Cabo Gracias a Dios in the east, and as far south as the upper Patuca River (Holt 1999). Tol (Jicaque) would have been spoken just to the west.

Phonology and orthography
Pech is a tonal language with 16 consonants and 10 vowels (Holt 1999). There are two tones, namely a high tone and a low tone. Both consonants and vowels display length contrast and nasalization.

Consonants 

Allophones of the sounds /b, ʃ, j, k, kʷ, w/ are realized as [β, tʃ, ᵈj~ɲ, ɡ, ɡʷ, ᵑw̃].

Notes:
[g] is the allophone of /k/ and occurs after a long vowel
/b/ becomes [β] in between vowels
The [c̆] allophone only exists for some speakers, those typically being younger speakers and speakers of non-Colón dialects. It occurs before a vowel, in place of /s̆/. It is possible that this allophone exists solely because of extensive contact with the Spanish language. 
/y/ and /w/ are nasalized whenever next to a nasal vowel; at the beginning of words these consonants become [dy] and [gw], respectively. The allophones [ñ] and [ŋw̃] occur because of the nasalization of [dy] and [gw], respectively.

Vowels/nasals 

Notes
Long vowels retain their full length in stressed, open syllables; they are shortened in closed or unstressed syllables. Short vowels are open and lax in closed  or unstressed syllables, unlike long vowels, which are close and tense. 
Nasal vowels are usually more open than oral vowels
Vowels may be voiceless between voiceless consonants in unstressed syllables

Alphabet and pronunciation 

In Pech, the high tone is shown with an accent over the vowel, and unmarked vowels are of the low tone.

Tone 
As a tone-language, Pech has two to three distinctive pitch-levels: high tone (á, é, í, ó, ú) low tone (à, è, ì, ò, ù),  and sometimes, extra low tone. This lower than normal tone is rare, though it occurs particularly with the suffix -rih. 
Tones distinguish between lexical items and inflectional types

Stress 
Pech has primary and secondary levels of stress, which are not distinctive. They rely on the underlying marked tone and stem syllables. Primary stress tends to occur in the last syllable of the stem. Primary and secondary stress are also related to inflectional suffixes.

Distribution of consonant phonemes

Syllable clusters
Initial consonant clusters begin with a true stop followed by /r/. These would include pr, tr, kr, and br.
Medial consonant clusters may contain two consonants, three consonants if either the initial or ending consonant is /r/, or four consonants if both the initial and ending consonants are /r/. 
Geminate consonant clusters only occur with /k/, /s/, and /s̆/
túkkawá I placed it
peessàwa their hands
warès̆s̆e:bàrs̆i we chopped them all down
Vowel clusters are usually diphthongal. Non-diphthongal vowel clusters have an associated glottal structure V?V
Diphthongs that occur are mostly ay and aw, though there are a few cases of ey.

Phonological processes 
Internal sandhi: this includes vocalic contraction and assimilation, vocalic and consonantal syncope, nasal assimilation, metathesis, and epenthesis
Vocalic contractions: 
a + a = a; i.e. a-ra-hà? becomes [-rá?]; 
a + w or w + a = o and a + wa = ɑ; i.e. apè:s̆wàkwa-térskà becomes [pè:s̆wàkotɛ́rská] 
a + i (or y) = e; i.e. ã̀-i-wá becomes [nḕw̃ã̀]
Vocalic assimilation:  when i precedes w, it becomes u (s̆i-wa becomes s̆uwa). This may possible include non-high vowels, as in the case with sàwa which is sometimes pronounced [sùwa]
Consonantal assimilation is actually quite rare as it seems to only really occcur in the word pes̆hará becoming [pes̆s̆rá] (when following /s̆/, /h/ is realized as /s̆/).
Nasal assimilation of vowels and semivowels occurs in segments in which vowels, glides, a glottal stop, and /h/ occur

Morphology 
Morphological processes present in this language include affixation, reduplication, voac lic ablaut, and heightening of phonemic tone. 

The four word classes that Pech has are nouns, verbs, adjectives, and particles.

Nouns
Prefixes and suffixes inflect nouns for possession. 

The 2nd-person plural involves discontiinuous morphermes
? appears between any prefixes and a noun beginning with a vowel, i.e. pè:-sòrwa vs ta?-ìraka

Inalienably Possessed Nouns:
These generally occur with possessive pronominal prefixes. These prefixes are only dropped when these noun-stems are part of compound nouns. 
Body-part terms
ta-sàwa 'my hand(s)'
a-màkú 'his/her navel'
a-súru 'its rib(s)'
Terms of spatial relationship: spatial relationships are composed of possessed relational nouns + locative case-suffix -yã̀. Examples of these terms:
a-sùkk-yã̀ 'behind/back'
a-wáki?-yã̀ 'in front of'
a-brì-yã̀ 'beside, alongside'
a-?à-yã̀ 'on top of'
a-ràhni-yã̀ 'outside of'
Note: 'between' does not follow this pattern, as seen in asà? a-kèrahã̀ 'between the stones'
Kinship Terms
ta-kà:ki 'my mother'
pí-tu:s 'your father'
a-ta-kày?ká 'my nephew'
a-šuwá 'her husband's brother'
a-sá?a 'his wife's sister'
ta-wã̀?ã 'my mother-in-law'
Words for natural emanations or effluvia: these are words possessed by natural substances, persons, or phenomena
e.g. asò a-wã̀ská  means steam, though its literal translation is 'water its-smoke'

Other special words: words expressing things that stand in special relationships  to humans
e.g. pata-tí:štahá meaning 'God', with its literal translation being 'our sower'

Case Suffixes with complex noun-phrases:
These are attached to the final word of the phrase
When there are multiple adjectives present, each is marked with the same case-suffix
In clauses, the case-marking suffix is usually associated with the verb

Emphatic Suffixes
These occur with subjects, direct objects, and. some oblique. objects that are already marked with case-suffixes. These suffixes are -ma (with subject, firect object noun, or noun-phrase) and -hã̀? (with o bjective and locative nouns)

Subject pronouns are optional, and are generally acccompanied by -yã̀? or -ma, though some may occur without.

Verbs
Verb inflection is made with prefixes and suffixes, though vocalic ablaut i s present in certain verb-stems and future-tense suffixes. Positions for the finite verb include: 
Object-pronominal prefix
Object case-marking morphemes
Verb-stem
Frequentative/durational aspect-suffixes
Completive suffix
Aspect-suffixes
Subject-suffixes
Negative suffix
Tense-suffixes
Modal and aspectual suffixes
2nd-person-plural suffix

Adjectives
Qualitative adjectives: uninflected, though case-suffixes may be present if phrase-finally in a noun phrase
Demonstrative adjectives: no definite article exists, though these serve a similar purpose and precede the nouns they modify. They include ī 'this, these' (proximal), tu? (~to?) 'that, those' (distal 1), ã 'that, those' (distal 2).
Numerals: appear independently after the nouns they modify

Adverbs
Adverbs of manner: can be created with the case-suffix -kán. 
Adverbs of time: morphologically postposiitional phrases involving the mediative case-suffix
Adverbs of location

Syntax

Word Order
Pech is an SOV (subject–object–verb) language (Holt 1999). There are exceptions to this, as oblique noun-phrases, adverbials, direct object noun-phrases, and subject noun-phrases all are capable of occurring after verbs. Overall, Pech is a synthetic language which uses mostly suffixes, but also prefixes, vocalic ablaut, and reduplication as well.

Sentences
In Pech, both simple and complex sentences exist. The first consists of a single independent clause while the latter consists of independent and dependent clauses. Independent nouns or pronoun subjects are not necessary within a sentence, and sentence may contain no more than a single verb form, within which the pronominal subject is marked. 

The focus of a sentence is marked by the emphatic suffix -ma,  which may follow nouns, pronouns, verbal nominals, time adverbials, and other word types. Object nouns and noun-phrases can be emphasized with the suffix -hã́?, which follows the objective or locative case-suffix. The suffixes -ma and -hã́? cannot both be within the same simple sentence. 

Other parts of a sentence are marked as follows:
 Conjunction: 
Noun + noun conjunction: add suffix -rih to each noun in the conjoined set
Verb + verb conjunction: serial verb-stems that include the stem, subject suffix, and object-prefixes for each verb involved. Common compound verb-stems include the verb nã̀-('go') and the verb tè?(k) in first and final position, with other verb-stems in between. Because verbal compounds are possible in Pech, verbal words can be quite lengthy. 
Verb-phrase and sentence conjunction: accomplished by linear sequencing; it does not require the use of a morpheme or conjunctive word
Disjunction: marked by the particle á:ã́srī́?
Subordination
The suffix -íná? is usually paired with the suffix -péšá? and means something along the lines of 'although' or 'even though'
Previative suffixes such as -tutàwá? and tu?[w]èr assign temporal priority to the main clause and relative anteriority to the subordinate clause
The suffix -táni? expresses indefinite future time, i.e. 'when, as soon as, etc.'
wã́ is a simultaneitive suffix that forms non-finite participial clauses meaning something like 'while, during, when, etc.'
Finite subordinate clauses: subordinating suffixes are added to conjugated verbs; these include -wà (present tense, and which changes depending on the subject and plurality) and -hã́? (future tense).
The suffix -mā? has a subjunctive meaning and is used to form if-clauses. 
The suffix -(à)srí serves the same purpose as -mā?, though it expresses more uncertainty
The suffix -rikeh expresses 'although, even though, etc.'; the difference between this and -íná? is not specified. -rás expresses the concept of 'because, since, etc.)
Interrogation 
The interrogative suffix -éreh is added to the verbal construction of a sentence in either the past or present tense to turn it into a yes-no question. For sentences in the future tense, the suffix used would be -iká.pīš can be used to express 'how many/how much?'
Question words (what/where/who/why) have the suffix -sah'How' also includes the verb kà?-/kì?- which means 'make/do' 

References

Sources
Holt, Dennis Graham. (1986).The Development of the Paya Sound-System. Ph.D. dissertation, Department of Linguistics, University of California, Los Angeles.
Holt, Dennis Graham. (1989). "On Paya Causatives." Estudios de Lingüística Chibcha 8: 7-15.  San José: Editorial de la Universidad de Costa Rica.
Holt, Dennis Graham. (1999). Pech (Paya).'' Languages of the World/Materials 366. Munich: LincomEuropa.

Subject–object–verb languages
Chibchan languages
Tonal languages
Languages of Honduras